Antal Simon (born 27 September 1965) is a retired Hungarian football midfielder.

References

1965 births
Living people
Hungarian footballers
Veikkausliiga players
Egri FC players
Vác FC players
Vasas SC players
Tampereen Pallo-Veikot players
FC Lahti players
FC Winterthur players
Association football midfielders
Hungarian expatriate footballers
Expatriate footballers in Finland
Hungarian expatriate sportspeople in Finland
Expatriate footballers in Switzerland
Hungarian expatriate sportspeople in Switzerland
Hungarian football managers
Zalaegerszegi TE managers
Nemzeti Bajnokság I managers